The 2017 Gent–Wevelgem – In Flanders Fields was a road cycling one-day race that took place on 26 March. It was the 79th edition of Gent–Wevelgem and the twelfth event of the 2017 UCI World Tour.

The pairing had broken away from a select group of riders in the run-in towards Wevelgem. The podium was completed by world champion Peter Sagan, as the peloton caught the select group in the closing metres.

Route
The race started in Deinze in East Flanders,  from Ghent. After turning inland again, the race continued south towards the French border, and just after halfway, crossed onto French soil at the commune of Boeschepe, with the first of the race's ten climbs coming at the Mont des Cats. This was followed by the Kokereelberg, the Vert Mont, and the two Mont Noir ascents, via the Côte du Ravel Put and the Côte de la Blanchisserie. The riders then returned to Belgium and climbed the Baneberg, the Kemmelberg and the Monteberg.

There was then a flatter section, looping through Mesen, Ploegsteert and Nieuwkerke. Within this loop was an addition for the 2017 race. On 24 November 2016, it was announced that the 2017 Gent–Wevelgem would honour the victims of World War I in the Flanders region and to commemorate the Christmas truce, by incorporating three semi-paved roads at the Ploegsteert Memorial to the Missing, in Ploegsteert Wood. The final two climbs were a repeat of the Baneberg–Kemmelberg combination; at the top of the final climb,  of fairly flat roads remained to the finish in Wevelgem.

Categorised climbs and semi-paved roads

Teams
As Gent–Wevelgem was a UCI World Tour event, all eighteen UCI WorldTeams were invited automatically and obliged to enter a team in the race. Seven UCI Professional Continental teams competed, completing the 25-team peloton. Race number 192 was unused as a mark of respect to Antoine Demoitié, who wore the number for  before his death at the 2016 edition of the race.

Result

References

External links

2017 UCI World Tour
2017 in Belgian sport
2017
March 2017 sports events in Europe